Ola High School or OLA High School may refer to:

 Ola High School (Arkansas), closed high school in Ola, Arkansas
 Ola High School (Georgia), high school in McDonough, Georgia
 OLA Girls Senior High School (Ho), high school in Ho, Ghana
 OLA Girls Senior High School (Kenyasi), high school in Kenyasi, Ghana